Fabian Benko (born 5 June 1998) is a professional footballer who plays as a midfielder for Oberliga Baden-Württemberg club SG Sonnenhof Großaspach. Born in Germany, Benko has represented both Germany and Croatia internationally at the junior level.

Club career

Bayern Munich
Born in Munich to Croatian parents, Benko joined Bayern Munich in 2005 when he was seven years old. He progressed through the club's academy side and was awarded an apprentice contract on 3 September 2015. The terms of the contract came into effect in June the following year with the effect of tying him to the club until 2018. In January 2016, Benko was one of five academy players invited by manager Pep Guardiola to travel with the senior squad to Doha on their mid-season tour and later featured in a pre-season tour of China.

Benko then appeared on the bench for Bayern for the first time in their Champions League match against Dinamo Zagreb on 12 December 2015 where he remained an unused substitute. Had he taken to the field he would have become the club's youngest ever player. He returned to and featured predominantly for Bayern's reserve side, Bayern Munich II, thereafter but his made his senior debut and only first team appearance on 19 August 2016, coming off the bench for Arturo Vidal in Bayern's 5–0 DFB-Pokal win over Carl Zeiss Jena.

LASK
On 5 June 2018, Benko was transferred to Austrian Bundesliga side LASK on a free transfer where he signed a three-year contract. The following month he was one of 100 players nominated for the Golden Boy award. Benko made his professional debut on 29 July 2018, coming on as a substitute in the 78th minute for Peter Michorl in the 3–1 away loss to Red Bull Salzburg.

SSV Ulm
Out-of-contract, Benko signed with Regionalliga Südwest side SSV Ulm on 4 August 2021.

International career

Youth national teams
Benko made his debut for the German U17 national team in 2014. He later elected to represent Croatia at the 2015 FIFA U-17 World Cup. In September 2016, amid discussion surrounding his international future, the Croatian Football Association confirmed that Benko had decided to continue to represent Croatia.

Career statistics

References

External links

1998 births
Footballers from Munich
German people of Croatian descent
Living people
Croatian footballers
Croatia youth international footballers
German footballers
Germany youth international footballers
Association football midfielders
FC Bayern Munich footballers
FC Bayern Munich II players
FC Juniors OÖ players
LASK players
SSV Ulm 1846 players
SG Sonnenhof Großaspach players
Regionalliga players
2. Liga (Austria) players
Austrian Football Bundesliga players
Oberliga (football) players
Croatian expatriate footballers
Expatriate footballers in Austria
Croatian expatriate sportspeople in Austria
German expatriate footballers
German expatriate sportspeople in Austria